Partial general elections were held in the Netherlands on 12 June 1877 to elect half the seats in the House of Representatives.

Results

By district
  Liberal  
  Conservative  
  Anti-revolutionary  
  Catholic

References

General elections in the Netherlands
Netherlands
1877 in the Netherlands
June 1877 events
Election and referendum articles with incomplete results